Frederick Stanley Bates (25 February 1899 – 13 August 1969) was an English first-class cricketer. A right-handed batsman, he made his first-class debut for Hampshire in the 1920 County Championship against Essex. Bates played a second first-class match that season, which was to be his final for the club, against Somerset.

Bates died in Hammersmith, London on 13 August 1969.

External links
Frederick Bates at Cricinfo
Frederick Bates at CricketArchive

1899 births
1969 deaths
People from Lambourn
English cricketers
Hampshire cricketers